The common name yellow mite may refer to any of the following species:
Lorryia formosa (Tydeidae)
Polyphagotarsonemus latus (Tarsonemidae)
Tarsonemus translucens (Tarsonemidae)
Oligonychus sacchari (Tetranychidae)
Eotetranychus cendanai (Tetranychidae)
Tetranychus urticae (Tetranychidae)
Typhlodromalus peregrinus (Phytoseiidae)

Animal common name disambiguation pages